This article is about the list of Domant Futebol Clube de Bula Atumba players.  Domant Futebol Clube is an Angolan football (soccer) club based in Caxito, Angola and plays at Estádio Municipal do Dande.  The club was established in 2005.

2010–2019
Domant FC players 2010–2019 

Manuel Oliveira replaced Juan Oliva who had replaced Paulo Saraiva

References

Domant FC
Association football player non-biographical articles